William Sheehan (born March 19, 1953) is an American musician. He is best known for playing the bass guitar with acts such as Talas, Steve Vai, David Lee Roth, Mr. Big, Niacin, and The Winery Dogs. He is also known for his "lead bass" playing style, including the use of chording, two-handed tapping,  "three-finger picking" technique and controlled feedback. Sheehan has been voted "Best Rock Bass Player" five times in Guitar Player readers' polls.

Career

Early years
Billy Sheehan's first electric bass was a Hagström FB, which was soon joined by a Precision bass. After acquiring the Precision bass, he removed the frets from the Hagström. Over the years, he heavily modified the Precision bass as well, scalloping the five highest frets, adding a neck pickup and additional support for the bolt-on neck, which Sheehan considers the instrument's greatest weakness. The neck pickup was added for what Sheehan referred to as "super deep low end" modelled after Paul Samwell-Smith of the Yardbirds and Mel Schacher of Grand Funk Railroad. The Gibson EB-0 type pickup in the neck and the original split-coil Precision bass pickup each have their own separate stereo output jacks on the bass itself, allowing for control of the tone via the bass. The Precision bass has since been retired, but Sheehan still affectionately refers to it as "The Wife". Sheehan's signature Yamaha Attitude bass is patterned after this instrument. Sheehan also uses two amps to achieve his signature tone, one with full distortion and high pass filtering to sound more guitar-like, and one super-clean for the low end of the neck pickup.

Talas

Sheehan's first full-time band was Talas, a power trio with Dave Constantino on guitar and Paul Varga on drums. The band played a mixture of cover songs and original material, and all three instrumentalists alternated on lead vocals.

Talas was a popular local band in Buffalo for over a decade, attaining a cult status which spread into the northeast US and into Canada. In 1979, Talas released their eponymous debut album, which generated the regional hit single, "See Saw". It was during this time that Sheehan wrote  "Shy Boy" (later re-recorded with David Lee Roth), and "Addicted to that Rush" (later re-recorded with Mr Big).

In the late 1970s, Sheehan also played in a band called Light Years with drummer Ron Rocco who had earlier played in a band called Black Sheep with Foreigner singer Lou Gramm in Rochester, NY. After Sheehan returned to Talas they opened a show for UFO in Buffalo. This led Sheehan to an association with guitarist Michael Schenker and also helped land him the job touring with UFO in 1983.

Talas' first national exposure happened in 1980, when they opened thirty shows for Van Halen. However, success was elusive, and even as their brand of what came to be known as "glam metal" gained popularity over the next few years, Talas remained an unsigned act, partly due to poor management.  They independently released their debut "Talas" LP on Evenfall Records (reissued by Metal Blade), and then "Sink Your Teeth into That" on Relativity Records.

Seeking to take Talas further than just regional success, Sheehan reformed Talas with another drummer (Mark Miller), guitarist (Mitch Perry, also later of Heaven), and a dedicated vocalist, Phil Naro, with whom in the late 1970s Sheehan had previously worked in his side project (the Billy Sheehan Band). Talas would release only one more album, Live Speed on Ice. After Mitch Perry left the band, he was replaced by Johnny Angel, who played guitar with them for their 1985/86 US tour opening for Yngwie Malmsteen's Rising Force. There was a fourth Talas record, tentatively titled "Lights, Camera, Action" to be issued on Gold Mountain/A&M, but it never got past the demo stage due to Sheehan leaving to join David Lee Roth's solo band. Talas did briefly continue on under Phil Naro sans Sheehan, enlisting Jimmy DeGrasso on drums, Al Pitrelli on guitar, Bruno Ravel on bass and Gary Bivona on keyboards but by this time Talas was dead and Ravel formed Danger Danger. Sheehan also auditioned for Toronto based rock band Max Webster, being a long time friend of Max Webster singer/guitarist Kim Mitchell. 

In the early 1980s, Sheehan became involved with the proto-thrash metal band Thrasher, during this time he shared the stage with future Anthrax guitarist Dan Spitz. His involvement with Thrasher did not last long but he did play on the self-titled LP, reissued on CD in 2008.

David Lee Roth band
See David Lee Roth.

Mr. Big
See Mr. Big (American band).

Niacin
In 1996, Sheehan formed the jazz fusion band Niacin with drummer Dennis Chambers and keyboardist John Novello. The band's name comes from the timbral foundation of the Hammond B3 organ; vitamin B3 is also known as niacin.

Niacin released their first studio album in 1996. Their music is primarily instrumental, with the exception of their third studio album, Deep (2000), which features vocals by Glenn Hughes of Deep Purple. The album also includes guest guitar by Steve Lukather of Toto.

The Winery Dogs and Sons of Apollo

Sheehan toured with PSMS (Portnoy / Sheehan / MacAlpine / Sherinian), an instrumental supergroup, in the second half of 2012.

Sheehan, along with Portnoy and Richie Kotzen, recorded the debut album for their new band The Winery Dogs in August 2012. The self-titled album was released on May 5, 2013 in Japan, and July 23, 2013 worldwide. Their second album Hot Streak was released in 2015.

In August 2017, he joined another band with Portnoy, a progressive metal supergroup named Sons of Apollo and also featuring keyboardist Derek Sherinian, vocalist Jeff Scott Soto and guitarist Ron "Bumblefoot" Thal.

Personal life
Sheehan has been an active member of the Church of Scientology since 1971, having converted from Catholicism.

Partial discography

With Talas 
1979: Talas
1982: Sink Your Teeth into That
1984: Live Speed on Ice
1990: Talas Years (compilation)
1998: If We Only Knew Then What We Know Now - Live in Buffalo
2022: 1985

With Thrasher
1985: Burning at the Speed of Light

With Daniel Piquê
2009: Boo!!
2012: Chu (websingle)
2013: Oldboy (websingle)

With Tony MacAlpine
1986: Edge of Insanity

With KUNI
1986: MASQUE

With David Lee Roth
1986: Eat 'Em and Smile
1986: Sonrisa Salvaje (Spanish language re-recording of Eat 'Em and Smile)
1988: Skyscraper

With Greg Howe
1988: Greg Howe

With Mr. Big 

1989: Mr. Big
1991: Lean into It
1993: Bump Ahead
1996: Hey Man
2000: Get Over It
2001: Actual Size
2010: What If...
2014: ...The Stories We Could Tell
2017: Defying Gravity

With Niacin
1996: Niacin
1997: Live
1998: High Bias
2000: Deep
2001: Time Crunch
2003: Live! Blood, Sweat & Beers
2005: Organik
 2005: Live in Tokyo (DVD)
2013: Krush

With Explorer's Club
1998: Age of Impact

Solo
2001: Compression
2005: Cosmic Troubadour
2006: Prime Cuts (compilation)
2009: Holy Cow!

Terry Bozzio and Billy Sheehan
2002: Nine Short Films

With Richie Kotzen
1998: What Is...
2003: Change
2006: Ai Senshi Z×R

With The Winery Dogs
2013: The Winery Dogs
2014: Unleashed in the East / Unleashed in Japan 
2015: Hot Streak
2017: Dog Years (EP) / Dog Years: Live in Santiago

With Michael Kocáb
2014: Aftershocks

With Sons of Apollo
2017: Psychotic Symphony2019: Live with the Plovdiv Psychotic Symphony2020: MMXXWith Mari Hamada
2018: Gracia2023: SoarWith MIWA
2018: Reach Out and Touch Me2020: Hell Is RealSee also
 Bass Frontiers Magazine The Handle, a baritone electric guitar under the signature Billytone''
 Shred guitar

Notes

References

External links

 Niacin official website
Billy Sheehan interview on Lane Music, 2021
Billy Sheehan interview on Guitar.com 2014
HardRadio.com interview by Joey Vera with Billy Sheehan, part 1
HardRadio.com interview by Joey Vera with Billy Sheehan, part 2
Interview with Billy Sheehan, 2009
Extensive CD collection published by or with participation of Billy Sheehan—continuously updated
 
 

Living people
Musicians from Buffalo, New York
American rock bass guitarists
American heavy metal bass guitarists
American male bass guitarists
American Scientologists
Mr. Big (American band) members
American session musicians
American male guitarists
Converts to Scientology from Roman Catholicism
20th-century American guitarists
Explorers Club (band) members
Michael Schenker Group members
The Winery Dogs members
1953 births
Favored Nations artists